The 2009–10 Algerian Cup was the 46th edition of the Algerian Cup. ES Sétif won the Cup by defeating CA Batna 3-0 in the final with a brace from Hocine Metref and an own goal from Saber Chebana. It was the seventh time that Sétif won the trophy.

Round of 32

Round of 16

Quarter-finals

Semi-finals
Kickoff times are in local time.

Final

Kickoff times are in local time.

Champions

References

 
 

Algerian Cup
Algerian Cup
Algerian Cup